In the 2014–15 season, JS Kabylie competed in the Ligue 1 for the 44th season, as well as the Algerian Cup. 

The season was largely defined by an incident on 23 August 2014, when Albert Ebosse Bodjongo was struck on the head by a projectile thrown by an unknown person while the teams were leaving the field at the end of a home game between JSK and USM Alger. The match had ended in a 2–1 defeat, with Bodjongo contributing the sole JSK goal. Bodjongo died a few hours later in hospital of a traumatic brain injury. He was aged 24. Following Bodjongo's death, the Algerian Football Federation suspended all football indefinitely and ordered the closure of the 1st November 1954 stadium.

Players
As of September 7, 2014:2015

Competitions

Overview

Ligue 1

League table

Results summary

Results by round

Matches

Algerian Cup

Squad information

Playing statistics

|-

|-
! colspan=10 style=background:#dcdcdc; text-align:center| Players transferred out during the season

Goalscorers
Includes all competitive matches. The list is sorted alphabetically by surname when total goals are equal.

Transfers

In

Out

References

JS Kabylie seasons
Algerian football clubs 2014–15 season